Roger-Émile Aubry, C.Ss.R., (11 April 1923 – 17 February 2010) was the Catholic bishop of the Vicariate Apostolic of Reyes, Bolivia.

Ordained to the priesthood on 24 February 1949, Pope Paul VI appointed Aubry bishop of the Reyes vicariate apostolic on 14 July 1973 and he was ordained on 16 September 1973 retiring on 1 May 1999.

References

1923 births
2010 deaths
20th-century Roman Catholic bishops in Bolivia
Redemptorists
Roman Catholic bishops of Reyes